The Teatro Metropol is a theater for audiovisual and artistic performances. Allowing 2,500 people standing or 1,100 people seated, it has the greatest capacity of any theater in the city of Bogotá.

It was constructed in the 1970s, and has been remodeled carefully to make it a stage for performing high impact shows because it has the infrastructure, acoustics and technology necessary to make any kind of cultural shows. It has restrooms, boxes, and a food and meeting room.

Originally it opened as a movie theater, splendor that is overshadowed by the appearance of multiplex cinema from different companies who marketed in malls.

From 2016 it was rented to a Christian organization, which no longer returned to make concerts; and it is uncertain when they will return to this chamber concerts.

Events 
Today this complex is used for organizing concerts due to the versatility of the place. Among the artists presented in this exhibition are:

Theatres in Bogotá
Tourist attractions in Bogotá